To be warring is to be engaged in organized violent conflict with one or more other belligerent groups or nations.

Warring may also refer to:

 Warring (surname), a surname
 Warring Kennedy (1827-1904), Irish-Canadian politician